Fraser Film Release and Photographic Company was an Australian film company formed in 1912 by two brothers, Archie and Colin Fraser. It operated as a film exchange, importing movies from overseas, and production house, making shorts, features and documentaries.

Early financial support came from Giuseppe Borsalino, an Italian businessman who invested in Italian films and used Fraser Films as an Australia outlet for his company. Among the filmmakers who worked for them were Franklyn Barrett, Raymond Longford and Alfred Rolfe.

Despite some early successes, the company suffered from pressure exerted by the "combine" of Australasian Films and decline of production from Europe due to World War I where Fraser brought many of their films. The company wound up in 1918.

Select credits
Whale Hunting in Jarvis Bay (1913) – documentary
A Blue Gum Romance (1913) – feature
The Life of a Jackeroo (1913) – feature
The Silence of Dean Maitland (1914) – feature
We'll Take her Children in amongst our own (1915) – short
The Day (1914) – feature
Ma Hogan's New Boarder (1915) – short
The Sunny South or The Whirlwind of Fate (1915) – feature
Murphy of Anzac (1916) – feature

References

External links
Archive and Colin Fraser at National Film and Sound Archive

Film distributors of Australia
Film production companies of Australia